Shaghol-e Bahar Ab (also Romanized as Shaghol-e Bahār Āb; also known as Shākhol-e Bahār Āb and Shaqol-e Bahār Āb) is a village in Mansuri Rural District, Homeyl District, Eslamabad-e Gharb County, Kermanshah Province, Iran. At the 2006 census, its population was 58, in 11 families.

References 

Populated places in Eslamabad-e Gharb County